Prince Henry's Welcome at Winchester was a masque produced by Anne of Denmark and performed in 1603 at Winchester on a day between 11 and 17 October.

Plague and a royal progress
Henry Frederick, Prince of Wales (1594–1612) was the son of James VI and I and Anne of Denmark. After the death of Queen Elizabeth in 1603, James became king in England, an event known as the Union of the Crowns. Prince Henry and his sister, Princess Elizabeth came to stay in England, first at Oatlands, then at Nonsuch. Prince Henry and Princess Elizabeth were moved from Nonsuch to Winchester, thought to be a more healthful place when plague came to London in June 1603.

A wardrobe servant died at Oatlands in August and the Prince and Princess were moved to Nonsuch. Two members of the queen's household died of plague in September. Anne of Denmark travelled to Winchester on 17 September 1603. King James and Anne had an audience with the Spanish ambassador, the Count of Villamediana at Winchester on 24 September. On 17 October Anne was moving to Wilton House, and Thomas Edmondes wrote to the Earl of Shrewsbury that she had done the Prince "the kindness at his coming hither to entertain him with a gallant mask".

Court theatre in time of plague
Few details are known about the masque which took place in October 1603, but it was mentioned in several newsletters. The title given to the event is not contemporary. The composer and musician John Dowland may have been involved; he mentioned meeting the queen at Winchester in the dedication of his Lachrimae. At the time, the lutenist and dancing master Thomas Cardell attended the queen and Princess Elizabeth. The queen's secretary, the poet William Fowler, who had written the baptism entertainments for Prince Henry in 1594, was also at Winchester. Fowler wrote to the Earl of Shrewsbury on 11 October from Winchester.

Arbella Stuart was present and mentioned the masque in her own letter as "an enterlude, (as ridiculous as it was) but not so ridiculous as my letter". She described the queen's household playing children's games in their Winchester lodging.

Lady Anne Clifford had visited Prince Henry at Nonsuch Palace in the first week of October and Clifford's cousin Frances Bourchier joined Princess Elizabeth's household. Some time after Michaelmas (11 October), Anne heard of the performance at Winchester, and she recalled that it had damaged the reputation of Anne of Denmark and the women of her court:Now there was much talk of a masque which the Queen had at Winchester and how all the ladies about the Court had gotten such ill-names that it was grown a scandalous place, and the Queen herself much fallen from her former greatness and reputation she had in the world.

Perhaps the personal participation of the queen and her ladies in the masque or dance caused the scandal. The adverse comment could reveal gender concerns, making "masques seem less like peaceful celebrations of royal power and virtue than sites of female misrule".

The queen's household at Winchester may have included; Anna Livingstone, Margaret Stewart, Anna Campbell, Jean Drummond and Margaret Hartsyde. Margaret Stewart danced at Basing House in September 1603 and played the part of Concordia in The Vision of the Twelve Goddesses. Before the court returned to London, according to Arbella Stuart, the Spanish ambassador, the Count of Villamediana, organised a dinner for Beaumont's wife, Anne de Rabot, asking her to invite some English ladies. She brought the Countess of Bedford, Lady Penelope Rich, Lady Susan de Vere, and "Lady Dorothy", probably Dorothy Hastings.

Planning masques for Christmas and the New Year
The masque at Winchester was mentioned in connections with plans for future court festivities. The French ambassador, Christophe de Harlay, Count of Beaumont, commented that Winchester show was "rustic" in the sense of unsophisticated (rather than in the pastoral genre) and served to raise the queen's spirits, and Anne of Denmark was planning a superior and more costly entertainments, realised as The Masque of Indian and China Knights and The Vision of the Twelve Goddesses. The Winchester masque seems to have been for her son, rather than for the entertainment of a diplomatic elite. John Leeds Barroll suggests it was a "domestic event". Dudley Carleton mentioned plans for Christmas at Windsor Castle, that "many plays and shows are bespoken, to give entertainment to our ambassadors". Thomas Edmondes wrote that the queen's preparations required the "use of invention" and the services of Hugh Sanford. Sanford was a tutor of the Earl of Pembroke.

Pleasing the ambassadors had become a priority: another French ambassador Louis de l'Hôpital, Sieur de Vitry, had already expressed dissatisfaction with a gift he received from the king. Lord Cecil wrote letters filled with anxiety that the Spanish and French ambassadors, the Count of Villamediana and the Marquis of Rosny, would find their hospitality less than that given the other, or their predecessors.

References

History of Winchester
English Renaissance plays
1603 plays
1603 in England
Masques
Court of James VI and I
European court festivities